Below is the list of populated places in Manisa Province, Turkey by district. In the following lists first place in each list is the administrative center of the district.

Manisa
 Manisa	
 Akçaköy, Manisa	
 Akgedik, Manisa	
 Asmacık, Manisa	
 Aşağıçobanisa, Manisa	
 Avdal, Manisa	
 Ayvacık, Manisa	
 Bağyolu, Manisa	
 Belenyenice, Manisa	
 Beydere, Manisa	
 Bostanlar, Manisa	
 Büyüksümbüller, Manisa	
 Çamköy, Manisa	
 Çamlıca, Manisa	
 Çavuşoğlu, Manisa	
 Çınarlıkuyu, Manisa	
 Davutlar, Manisa	
 Dazyurt, Manisa	
 Demirci, Manisa	
 Durasıllı, Manisa	
 Düzlen, Manisa	
 Emlakdere, Manisa	
 Evrenos, Manisa	
 Gökbel, Manisa	
 Gökçeler, Manisa	
 Gülbahçe, Manisa	
 Gürle, Manisa	
 Güzelköy, Manisa	
 Hacıhaliller, Manisa	
 Halıtlı, Manisa	
 Hamzabeyli, Manisa	
 İlyasçılar, Manisa	
 Kağan, Manisa	
 Kaleköy, Manisa	
 Kalemli, Manisa	
 Karaağaçlı, Manisa	
 Karaahmetli, Manisa	
 Karaali, Manisa	
 Karahüseyinli, Manisa	
 Karakılıçlı, Manisa	
 Karakoca, Manisa	
 Karaoğlanlı, Manisa	
 Karaveliler, Manisa	
 Karayağcıhacılar, Manisa	
 Karayenice, Manisa	
 Kayapınar, Manisa	
 Kırançiftliği, Manisa	
 Kışlaköy, Manisa	
 Kocakoru, Manisa	
 Koruköy, Manisa	
 Kozaklar, Manisa	
 Küçükbelen, Manisa	
 Küçüksümbüller, Manisa	
 Maldan, Manisa	
 Manisa, Manisa	
 Mollasüleymanlı, Manisa	
 Muradiye, Manisa	
 Müslih, Manisa	
 Ortaköy, Manisa	
 Osmancalı, Manisa	
 Otmanlar, Manisa	
 Örencik, Manisa	
 Örselli, Manisa	
 Pelitalan, Manisa	
 Pınarköy, Manisa	
 Recepli, Manisa	
 Sakallı, Manisa	
 Sancaklıbozköy, Manisa	
 Sancaklıçeşmebaşı, Manisa	
 Sancaklıiğdecik, Manisa	
 Sancaklıkayadibi, Manisa	
 Sancaklıuzunçınar, Manisa	
 Sarıahmetli, Manisa	
 Sarıalan, Manisa	
 Sarınasuhlar, Manisa	
 Sarma, Manisa	
 Selimşahlar, Manisa	
 Siyekli, Manisa	
 Sümbültepe, Manisa	
 Süngüllü, Manisa	
 Şamar, Manisa	
 Tekeliler, Manisa	
 Tepecik, Manisa	
 Tilkisüleymaniye, Manisa	
 Turgutalp, Manisa	
 Türkmen, Manisa	
 Uzunburun, Manisa	
 Uzunlar, Manisa	
 Üçpınar, Manisa	
 Veziroğlu, Manisa	
 Yağcılar, Manisa	
 Yaylaköy, Manisa	
 Yeniharmandalı, Manisa	
 Yeniköy, Manisa	
 Yenimahmudiye, Manisa	
 Yeşilköy, Manisa	
 Yukarıçobanisa, Manisa	
 Yuntdağıköseler, Manisa	
 Yuntdağyenice, Manisa

Ahmetli
 Ahmetli	
 Alahıdır, Ahmetli	
 Ataköy, Ahmetli	
 Bahçecik, Ahmetli	
 Cambazlı, Ahmetli	
 Dereköy, Ahmetli	
 Derici, Ahmetli	
 Dibekdere, Ahmetli	
 Gökkaya, Ahmetli	
 Hacıköseli, Ahmetli	
 Halilkahya, Ahmetli	
 Karaköy, Ahmetli	
 Kargın, Ahmetli	
 Kendirlik, Ahmetli	
 Kestelli, Ahmetli	
 Mandallı, Ahmetli	
 Seydiköy, Ahmetli	
 Yaraşlı, Ahmetli

Akhisar
 Akhisar	
 Zeytinliova, Akhisar	
 Akçaalan, Akhisar	
 Akçeşme, Akhisar	
 Akkocalı, Akhisar	
 Akselendi, Akhisar	
 Arabacıbozköy, Akhisar	
 Aşağıdolma, Akhisar	
 Ballıca, Akhisar	
 Başlamış, Akhisar	
 Bekirler, Akhisar	
 Beyoba, Akhisar	
 Boyalılar, Akhisar	
 Büknüş, Akhisar	
 Bünyanosmaniye, Akhisar	
 Çamönü, Akhisar	
 Çanakçı, Akhisar	
 Çıtak, Akhisar	
 Çobanhasan, Akhisar	
 Çoruk, Akhisar	
 Dağdere, Akhisar	
 Dayıoğlu, Akhisar	
 Dereköy, Akhisar	
 Dingiller, Akhisar	
 Doğankaya, Akhisar	
 Doğuca, Akhisar	
 Dolmadeğirmen, Akhisar	
 Durasıl, Akhisar	
 Erdelli, Akhisar	
 Eroğlu, Akhisar	
 Evkafteke, Akhisar	
 Göcek, Akhisar	
 Gökçeahmet, Akhisar	
 Gökçeler, Akhisar	
 Hacıibrahimler, Akhisar	
 Hacıosmanlar, Akhisar	
 Hamidiye, Akhisar	
 Hamitköy, Akhisar	
 Hanpaşa, Akhisar	
 Harmandalı, Akhisar	
 Hasköy, Akhisar	
 Işıkköy, Akhisar	
 İsaca, Akhisar	
 Kabaağaçkıran, Akhisar	
 Kadıdağı, Akhisar	
 Kapaklı, Akhisar	
 Karabörklü, Akhisar	
 Karaköy, Akhisar	
 Karayağcı, Akhisar	
 Kavakalan, Akhisar	
 Kayalıoğlu, Akhisar	
 Kayganlı, Akhisar	
 Kızlaralanı, Akhisar	
 Kobaşdere, Akhisar	
 Kocakağan, Akhisar	
 Kömürcü, Akhisar	
 Kulaksızlar, Akhisar	
 Kurtulmuş, Akhisar	
 Mecidiye, Akhisar	
 Medar, Akhisar	
 Moralılar, Akhisar	
 Musaca, Akhisar	
 Musalar, Akhisar	
 Muştullar, Akhisar	
 Pekmezci, Akhisar	
 Pınarcık, Akhisar	
 Rahmiye, Akhisar	
 Sabancılar, Akhisar	
 Sağrakçı, Akhisar	
 Sakarkaya, Akhisar	
 Sarıçalı, Akhisar	
 Sarılar, Akhisar	
 Sarnıçköy, Akhisar	
 Sazoba, Akhisar	
 Seğirdim, Akhisar	
 Selçikli, Akhisar	
 Selvili, Akhisar	
 Sırtköy, Akhisar	
 Sindelli, Akhisar	
 Söğütlü, Akhisar	
 Süleymanköy, Akhisar	
 Süleymanlı, Akhisar	
 Sünnetçiler, Akhisar	
 Şehitler, Akhisar	
 Taşçılar, Akhisar	
 Topluca, Akhisar	
 Tütenli, Akhisar	
 Ulupınar, Akhisar	
 Üçavlu, Akhisar	
 Yatağan, Akhisar	
 Yayakırıldık, Akhisar	
 Yaykın, Akhisar	
 Yeğenoba, Akhisar	
 Yenice, Akhisar	
 Yenidoğan, Akhisar	
 Zeytinlibağ, Akhisar

Alaşehir
 Alaşehir	
 Akkeçili, Alaşehir	
 Alhan, Alaşehir	
 Aydoğdu, Alaşehir	
 Azıtepe, Alaşehir	
 Badınca, Alaşehir	
 Bahadır, Alaşehir	
 Bahçedere, Alaşehir	
 Bahçeliköy, Alaşehir	
 Baklacı, Alaşehir	
 Belenyaka, Alaşehir	
 Caberburhan, Alaşehir	
 Caberfakılı, Alaşehir	
 Caberkamara, Alaşehir	
 Çağlayan, Alaşehir	
 Çakırcaali, Alaşehir	
 Çamlıbel, Alaşehir	
 Çarıkbozdağ, Alaşehir	
 Çarıkkaralar, Alaşehir	
 Çeşneli, Alaşehir	
 Dağarlar, Alaşehir	
 Dağhacıyusuf, Alaşehir	
 Delemenler, Alaşehir	
 Erenköy, Alaşehir	
 Evrenli, Alaşehir	
 Girelli, Alaşehir	
 Göbekli, Alaşehir	
 Gülenyaka, Alaşehir	
 Gülpınar, Alaşehir	
 Gümüşçay, Alaşehir	
 Gürsu, Alaşehir	
 Hacıaliler, Alaşehir	
 Horzumalayaka, Alaşehir	
 Horzumembelli, Alaşehir	
 Horzumkeserler, Alaşehir	
 Horzumsazdere, Alaşehir	
 Ilgın, Alaşehir	
 Işıklar, Alaşehir	
 İsmailbey, Alaşehir	
 İsmetiye, Alaşehir	
 Karacalar, Alaşehir	
 Karadağ, Alaşehir	
 Kasaplı, Alaşehir	
 Kavaklıdere, Alaşehir	
 Kemaliye, Alaşehir	
 Kestanederesi, Alaşehir	
 Killik, Alaşehir	
 Kozluca, Alaşehir	
 Kurudere, Alaşehir	
 Matarlı, Alaşehir	
 Narlıdere, Alaşehir	
 Osmaniye, Alaşehir	
 Örencik, Alaşehir	
 Örnekköy, Alaşehir	
 Piyadeler, Alaşehir	
 Sarıpınar, Alaşehir	
 Selce, Alaşehir	
 Serinköy, Alaşehir	
 Serinyayla, Alaşehir	
 Sobran, Alaşehir	
 Soğanlı, Alaşehir	
 Soğukyurt, Alaşehir	
 Subaşı, Alaşehir	
 Şahyar, Alaşehir	
 Tepeköy, Alaşehir	
 Toygar, Alaşehir	
 Türkmen, Alaşehir	
 Uluderbent, Alaşehir	
 Üzümlü, Alaşehir	
 Yeniköy, Alaşehir	
 Yeşilyurt, Alaşehir	
 Yuvacalı, Alaşehir

Demirci
 Demirci	
 Ahatlar, Demirci	
 Ahmetler, Demirci	
 Akdere, Demirci	
 Alaağaç, Demirci	
 Armağan, Demirci	
 Armutlu, Demirci	
 Ayvaalan, Demirci	
 Azizbey, Demirci	
 Bardakçı, Demirci	
 Bayramşah, Demirci	
 Borlu, Demirci	
 Boyacık, Demirci	
 Bozçatlı, Demirci	
 Bozköy, Demirci	
 Büyükkıran, Demirci	
 Çağıllar, Demirci	
 Çamköy, Demirci	
 Çanakçı, Demirci	
 Çandır, Demirci	
 Çardaklı, Demirci	
 Çataloluk, Demirci	
 Çayköy, Demirci	
 Danişmentler, Demirci	
 Demirci, Demirci	
 Durhasan, Demirci	
 Elek, Demirci	
 Esenyurt, Demirci	
 Eskihisar, Demirci	
 Gökveliler, Demirci	
 Gömeçler, Demirci	
 Gülpınar, Demirci	
 Gümele, Demirci	
 Gürçeşme, Demirci	
 Güveli, Demirci	
 Hırkalı, Demirci	
 Hoşçalar, Demirci	
 Hüdük, Demirci	
 Iklıkçı, Demirci	
 İcikler, Demirci	
 İmceler, Demirci	
 İmrenler, Demirci	
 İrişler, Demirci	
 İsmailler, Demirci	
 Karaisalar, Demirci	
 Kargınışıklar, Demirci	
 Karyağdı, Demirci	
 Kayaköy, Demirci	
 Kayranokçular, Demirci	
 Kazancı, Demirci	
 Kerpiçlik, Demirci	
 Kılavuzlar, Demirci	
 Kışlak, Demirci	
 Kovancı, Demirci	
 Köylüce, Demirci	
 Kulalar, Demirci	
 Kulalı, Demirci	
 Kuzeyir, Demirci	
 Kuzuköy, Demirci	
 Küçükkıran, Demirci	
 Küçükoba, Demirci	
 Küpeler, Demirci	
 Mahmutlar, Demirci	
 Marmaracık, Demirci	
 Mezitler, Demirci	
 Minnetler, Demirci	
 Öksüzlü, Demirci	
 Ören, Demirci	
 Örücüler, Demirci	
 Rahmanlar, Demirci	
 Sağnıç, Demirci	
 Saraycık, Demirci	
 Sayık, Demirci	
 Selviler, Demirci	
 Serçeler, Demirci	
 Sevişler, Demirci	
 Söğütçük, Demirci	
 Talas, Demirci	
 Taşokçular, Demirci	
 Tekeler, Demirci	
 Teperik, Demirci	
 Tokmaklı, Demirci	
 Ulacık, Demirci	
 Üşümüş, Demirci	
 Yabacı, Demirci	
 Yarbasan, Demirci	
 Yavaşlar, Demirci	
 Yenice, Demirci	
 Yeşildere, Demirci	
 Yeşiloba, Demirci	
 Yiğenler, Demirci	
 Yiğitler, Demirci	
 Yumuklar, Demirci

Gölmarmara
 Gölmarmara	
 Ayanlar, Gölmarmara	
 Beyler, Gölmarmara	
 Çamköy, Gölmarmara	
 Çömlekçi, Gölmarmara	
 Deynekler, Gölmarmara	
 Hacıbaştanlar, Gölmarmara	
 Hacıveliler, Gölmarmara	
 Hıroğlu, Gölmarmara	
 Kayaaltı, Gölmarmara	
 Kılcanlar, Gölmarmara	
 Ozanca, Gölmarmara	
 Taşkuyucak, Gölmarmara	
 Tiyenli, Gölmarmara	
 Yeniköy, Gölmarmara	
 Yunuslar, Gölmarmara

Gördes
 Gördes	
 Akpınar, Gördes	
 Balıklı, Gördes	
 Bayat, Gördes	
 Beğel, Gördes	
 Beğenler, Gördes	
 Benlieli, Gördes	
 Boyalı, Gördes	
 Börez, Gördes	
 Çağlayan, Gördes	
 Çatalarmut, Gördes	
 Çiçekli, Gördes	
 Çiğiller, Gördes	
 Dalkara, Gördes	
 Dargıl, Gördes	
 Deliçoban, Gördes	
 Dereçiftlik, Gördes	
 Dikilitaş, Gördes	
 Doğanpınar, Gördes	
 Dutluca, Gördes	
 Efendili, Gördes	
 Fundacık, Gördes	
 Gülpınar, Gördes	
 Güneşli, Gördes	
 Kabakoz, Gördes	
 Kalemoğlu, Gördes	
 Karaağaç, Gördes	
 Karakeçili, Gördes	
 Karayağcı, Gördes	
 Karayakup, Gördes	
 Kaşıkçı, Gördes	
 Kayacık, Gördes	
 Kılcanlar, Gördes	
 Kıran, Gördes	
 Kıymık, Gördes	
 Kızıldam, Gördes	
 Kobaklar, Gördes	
 Korubaşı, Gördes	
 Köseler, Gördes	
 Kuşluk, Gördes	
 Kuyucakkarapınar, Gördes	
 Kürekçi, Gördes	
 Malaz, Gördes	
 Malkoca, Gördes	
 Merkez Tepe, Gördes	
 Oğulduruk, Gördes	
 Pınarbaşı, Gördes	
 Salur, Gördes	
 Sarıaliler, Gördes	
 Şahinkaya, Gördes	
 Şeyhyayla, Gördes	
 Tüpüler, Gördes	
 Ulgar, Gördes	
 Yakaköy, Gördes	
 Yeniköy, Gördes	
 Yeşilyurt, Gördes

Kırkağaç
 Kırkağaç	
 Alacalar, Kırkağaç	
 Alifakı, Kırkağaç	
 Bademli, Kırkağaç	
 Bakır, Kırkağaç	
 Bostancı, Kırkağaç	
 Çaltıcak, Kırkağaç	
 Çiftlik, Kırkağaç	
 Çobanlar, Kırkağaç	
 Demirtaş, Kırkağaç	
 Dualar, Kırkağaç	
 Fırdanlar, Kırkağaç	
 Gebeler, Kırkağaç	
 Gelenbe, Kırkağaç	
 Gökçukur, Kırkağaç	
 Güvendik, Kırkağaç	
 Hacet, Kırkağaç	
 Halkahavlu, Kırkağaç	
 Hamidiye, Kırkağaç	
 Hamitli, Kırkağaç	
 Işıklar, Kırkağaç	
 İlyaslar, Kırkağaç	
 Karakurt, Kırkağaç	
 Kınık, Kırkağaç	
 Kocaiskan, Kırkağaç	
 Kuyucak, Kırkağaç	
 Küçükyaya, Kırkağaç	
 Musahoca, Kırkağaç	
 Öğeçli, Kırkağaç	
 Sakarlı, Kırkağaç	
 Siledik, Kırkağaç	
 Söğütalan, Kırkağaç	
 Yağmurlu, Kırkağaç

Köprübaşı
 Köprübaşı	
 Akçaalan, Köprübaşı	
 Alanyolu, Köprübaşı	
 Arpacı, Köprübaşı	
 Azimli, Köprübaşı	
 Bozburun, Köprübaşı	
 Cıcıklı, Köprübaşı	
 Çarıklar, Köprübaşı	
 Çavullar, Köprübaşı	
 Döğüşören, Köprübaşı	
 Esat, Köprübaşı	
 Gölbaşı, Köprübaşı	
 Gündoğdu, Köprübaşı	
 İkizkuyu, Köprübaşı	
 Karaelmacık, Köprübaşı	
 Kasar, Köprübaşı	
 Kavakyeri, Köprübaşı	
 Kemhallı, Köprübaşı	
 Kıdırcık, Köprübaşı	
 Kınık, Köprübaşı	
 Kıranşeyh, Köprübaşı	
 Killik, Köprübaşı	
 Kozaklı, Köprübaşı	
 Kurtlar, Köprübaşı	
 Mestanlı, Köprübaşı	
 Rağıllar, Köprübaşı	
 Sargaç, Köprübaşı	
 Uğurlu, Köprübaşı	
 Yardere, Köprübaşı	
 Yeşilköy, Köprübaşı

Kula
 Kula	
 Ahmetli, Kula	
 Aktaş, Kula	
 Ayazören, Kula	
 Ayvatlar, Kula	
 Balıbey, Kula	
 Başıbüyük, Kula	
 Battalmustafa, Kula	
 Bayramşah, Kula	
 Bebekli, Kula	
 Börtlüce, Kula	
 Çarıkballı, Kula	
 Çarıkmahmutlu, Kula	
 Çarıktekke, Kula	
 Çiftçiibrahim, Kula	
 Dereköy, Kula	
 Emre, Kula	
 Encekler, Kula	
 Erenbağı, Kula	
 Eroğlu, Kula	
 Esenyazı, Kula	
 Evciler, Kula	
 Gökçeören, Kula	
 Gökdere, Kula	
 Gölbaşı, Kula	
 Güvercinlik, Kula	
 Hacıtufan, Kula	
 Hamidiye, Kula	
 Hayalli, Kula	
 İbrahimağa, Kula	
 İncesu, Kula	
 Kalınharman, Kula	
 Karaoba, Kula	
 Kavacık, Kula	
 Kenger, Kula	
 Konurca, Kula	
 Körez, Kula	
 Narıncalıpıtrak, Kula	
 Narıncalısüleyman, Kula	
 Ortaköy, Kula	
 Papuçlu, Kula	
 Sandal, Kula	
 Saraçlar, Kula	
 Sarnıç, Kula	
 Söğütdere, Kula	
 Şehitlioğlu, Kula	
 Şeremet, Kula	
 Şeritli, Kula	
 Şıhlı, Kula	
 Tatlıçeşme, Kula	
 Topuzdamları, Kula	
 Yağbastı, Kula	
 Yeniköy, Kula	
 Yeşilyayla, Kula	
 Yurtbaşı, Kula

Salihli
 Salihli	
 Adala, Salihli	
 Akçaköy, Salihli	
 Akören, Salihli	
 Akyar, Salihli	
 Allahdiyen, Salihli	
 Bağcılar, Salihli	
 Bahçecik, Salihli	
 Başlıoğlu, Salihli	
 Bektaşlar, Salihli	
 Beylikli, Salihli	
 Burhan, Salihli	
 Caferbey, Salihli	
 Çakaldoğanlar, Salihli	
 Çaltılı, Salihli	
 Çamurhamamı, Salihli	
 Çapaklı, Salihli	
 Çavlu, Salihli	
 Çayköy, Salihli	
 Çaypınar, Salihli	
 Çelikli, Salihli	
 Çökelek, Salihli	
 Çukuroba, Salihli	
 Damatlı, Salihli	
 Delibaşlı, Salihli	
 Derbent, Salihli	
 Dombaylı, Salihli	
 Durasıllı, Salihli	
 Eldelek, Salihli	
 Eminbey, Salihli	
 Emirhacılı, Salihli	
 Gökeyüp, Salihli	
 Gökköy, Salihli	
 Hacıbektaşlı, Salihli	
 Hacıhıdır, Salihli	
 Hacıköseli, Salihli	
 Hacılı, Salihli	
 Hasalan, Salihli	
 İğdecik, Salihli	
 Kabazlı, Salihli	
 Kale, Salihli	
 Kapancı, Salihli	
 Kaplan, Salihli	
 Karaağaç, Salihli	
 Karaoğlanlı, Salihli	
 Karapınar, Salihli	
 Karasavcı, Salihli	
 Karayahşi, Salihli	
 Kemer, Salihli	
 Kemerdamları, Salihli	
 Kırdamları, Salihli	
 Kızılhavlu, Salihli	
 Kordon, Salihli	
 Köseali, Salihli	
 Kurttutan, Salihli	
 Mamatlı, Salihli	
 Mersindere, Salihli	
 Mersinli, Salihli	
 Mevlutlu, Salihli	
 Oraklar, Salihli	
 Ortaköy, Salihli	
 Pazarköy, Salihli	
 Poyraz, Salihli	
 Poyrazdamları, Salihli	
 Sart, Salihli	
 Sindel, Salihli	
 Süleymaniye, Salihli	
 Şirinyer, Salihli	
 Taytan, Salihli	
 Tekelioğlu, Salihli	
 Torunlu, Salihli	
 Üçtepe, Salihli	
 Yağbasan, Salihli	
 Yağmurlar, Salihli	
 Yeniköy, Salihli	
 Yenipazar, Salihli	
 Yeşilkavak, Salihli	
 Yeşilova, Salihli	
 Yılmaz, Salihli

Sarıgöl
 Sarıgöl	
 Afşar, Sarıgöl	
 Ahmetağa, Sarıgöl	
 Alemşahlı, Sarıgöl	
 Bağlıca, Sarıgöl	
 Bahadırlar, Sarıgöl	
 Baharlar, Sarıgöl	
 Bereketli, Sarıgöl	
 Beyharmanı, Sarıgöl	
 Çanakçı, Sarıgöl	
 Çavuşlar, Sarıgöl	
 Çimentepe, Sarıgöl	
 Dadağlı, Sarıgöl	
 Dindarlı, Sarıgöl	
 Doğuşlar, Sarıgöl	
 Emcelli, Sarıgöl	
 Güneydamları, Sarıgöl	
 Günyaka, Sarıgöl	
 Kahramanlar, Sarıgöl	
 Karacaali, Sarıgöl	
 Kızılçukur, Sarıgöl	
 Özpınar, Sarıgöl	
 Selimiye, Sarıgöl	
 Sığırtmaçlı, Sarıgöl	
 Şeyhdavutlar, Sarıgöl	
 Tırazlar, Sarıgöl	
 Yeniköy, Sarıgöl	
 Yeşiltepe, Sarıgöl	
 Yukarıkoçaklar, Sarıgöl	
 Ziyanlar, Sarıgöl

Saruhanlı
 Saruhanlı	
 Adiloba, Saruhanlı	
 Alibeyli, Saruhanlı	
 Apak, Saruhanlı	
 Aydınlar, Saruhanlı	
 Azimli, Saruhanlı	
 Bahadır, Saruhanlı	
 Bedeller, Saruhanlı	
 Büyükbelen, Saruhanlı	
 Çakmaklı, Saruhanlı	
 Çaltepe, Saruhanlı	
 Çamlıyurt, Saruhanlı	
 Çınaroba, Saruhanlı	
 Çullugörece, Saruhanlı	
 Develi, Saruhanlı	
 Dilek, Saruhanlı	
 Gökçe, Saruhanlı	
 Gözlet, Saruhanlı	
 Gümülceli, Saruhanlı	
 Hacımusa, Saruhanlı	
 Hacırahmanlı, Saruhanlı	
 Halitpaşa, Saruhanlı	
 Hatıplar, Saruhanlı	
 Heybeli, Saruhanlı	
 İshakçelebi, Saruhanlı	
 Kayışlar, Saruhanlı	
 Kemiklidere, Saruhanlı	
 Kepenekli, Saruhanlı	
 Koldere, Saruhanlı	
 Koyuncu, Saruhanlı	
 Kumkuyucak, Saruhanlı	
 Lütfiye, Saruhanlı	
 Mütevelli, Saruhanlı	
 Nuriye, Saruhanlı	
 Paşaköy, Saruhanlı	
 Pınarbaşı, Saruhanlı	
 Sarıçam, Saruhanlı	
 Sarısığırlı, Saruhanlı	
 Seyitoba, Saruhanlı	
 Şatırlar, Saruhanlı	
 Taşdibi, Saruhanlı	
 Tirkeş, Saruhanlı	
 Yeniosmaniye, Saruhanlı

Selendi
 Selendi	
 Akçakertil, Selendi	
 Altınköy, Selendi	
 Aşağıgüllüce, Selendi	
 Avlaşa, Selendi	
 Beypınar, Selendi	
 Çalıklı, Selendi	
 Çamköy, Selendi	
 Çamlıca, Selendi	
 Çampınar, Selendi	
 Çamyayla, Selendi	
 Çanşa, Selendi	
 Çıkrıkçı, Selendi	
 Çinan, Selendi	
 Çortak, Selendi	
 Dedeler, Selendi	
 Dumanlar, Selendi	
 Eskin, Selendi	
 Gölbaşı, Selendi	
 Hacılar, Selendi	
 Halılar, Selendi	
 Havaoğlu, Selendi	
 Kabaklar, Selendi	
 Karabeyler, Selendi	
 Karakozan, Selendi	
 Karaselendi, Selendi	
 Karataşterziler, Selendi	
 Kayranlar, Selendi	
 Kazıklı, Selendi	
 Kınık, Selendi	
 Kurşunlu, Selendi	
 Kürkçü, Selendi	
 Mıdıklı, Selendi	
 Mollaahmetler, Selendi	
 Omurlar, Selendi	
 Pınarlar, Selendi	
 Rahmanlar, Selendi	
 Satılmış, Selendi	
 Selmanhacılar, Selendi	
 Şehirlioğlu, Selendi	
 Tavak, Selendi	
 Tepeynihan, Selendi	
 Turpçu, Selendi	
 Yağcı, Selendi	
 Yenice, Selendi	
 Yukarıgüllüce, Selendi	
 Zıramanlar, Selendi

Soma
 Soma	
 Avdan, Soma	
 Adil, Soma	
 Akçaavlu, Soma	
 Bayat, Soma	
 Beyce, Soma	
 Boncuklu, Soma	
 Bozarmut, Soma	
 Büyük Güney, Soma	
 Büyük Işıklar, Soma	
 Cenkyeri, Soma	
 Çatalçam, Soma	
 Çavdır, Soma	
 Çevircek, Soma	
 Darkale, Soma	
 Deniş, Soma	
 Dereköy, Soma	
 Devlethan, Soma	
 Dualar, Soma	
 Duğla, Soma	
 Eğnez, Soma	
 Evciler, Soma	
 Göktaş, Soma	
 Hacıyusuf, Soma	
 Hamidiye, Soma	
 Hatun, Soma	
 Heciz, Soma	
 Kaplan, Soma	
 Karacahisar, Soma	
 Karacakaş, Soma	
 Karaçam, Soma	
 Kayrakaltı, Soma	
 Kızılören, Soma	
 Kiraz, Soma	
 Kobaklar, Soma	
 Koyundere, Soma	
 Kozanlı, Soma	
 Kozluören, Soma	
 Kum, Soma	
 Küçük Güney, Soma	
 Menteşe, Soma	
 Naldöken, Soma	
 Pirahmet, Soma	
 Sarıkaya, Soma	
 Sevişler, Soma	
 Söğütçük, Soma	
 Sultaniye, Soma	
 Tabanlar, Soma	
 Tekeli Işıklar, Soma	
 Turgutalp, Soma	
 Türkali, Soma	
 Türkpiyala, Soma	
 Ularca, Soma	
 Uruzlar, Soma	
 Vakıflı, Soma	
 Yağcılı, Soma	
 Yayladalı, Soma	
 Yırca, Soma

Turgutlu
 Turgutlu	
 Akçapınar, Turgutlu	
 Akköy, Turgutlu	
 Aşağıbozkır, Turgutlu	
 Avşar, Turgutlu	
 Ayvacık, Turgutlu	
 Baktırlı, Turgutlu	
 Bozkır, Turgutlu	
 Çampınar, Turgutlu	
 Çatalköprü, Turgutlu	
 Çepnibektaş, Turgutlu	
 Çepnidere, Turgutlu	
 Çıkrıkçı, Turgutlu	
 Dağyeniköy, Turgutlu	
 Dalbahçe, Turgutlu	
 Derbent, Turgutlu	
 Gökgedik, Turgutlu	
 Güney, Turgutlu	
 Hacıisalar, Turgutlu	
 Irlamaz, Turgutlu	
 İzzettin, Turgutlu	
 Kabaçınar, Turgutlu	
 Karaköy, Turgutlu	
 Karaoluk, Turgutlu	
 Kayrak, Turgutlu	
 Kurudere, Turgutlu	
 Kuşlar, Turgutlu	
 Musacalı, Turgutlu	
 Musalaryeniköy, Turgutlu	
 Osmancık, Turgutlu	
 Ören, Turgutlu	
 Sarıbey, Turgutlu	
 Sinirli, Turgutlu	
 Sivrice, Turgutlu	
 Temrek, Turgutlu	
 Urganlı, Turgutlu	
 Yakuplar, Turgutlu	
 Yaykın, Turgutlu	
 Yeniköy, Turgutlu	
 Yunusdere, Turgutlu

Recent development

According to Law act no 6360, all Turkish provinces with a population more than 750 000, were renamed as metropolitan municipality. Furthermore, the central district will be split into two and two new districts are established ; Yunusemre and Şehzadeler. All districts in those provinces became second level municipalities and all villages in those districts  were renamed as a neighborhoods . Thus the villages listed above are officially neighborhoods of Manisa.

References

List
Manisa